Alexander Lee Nicol (March 13, 1895 – July 22, 1967) was an American political figure on the state level who served as Speaker of the Wisconsin State Assembly during its 1949–50 session.

Born in the small Wisconsin city of Sparta, he served as an officer in the United States Army during World War I and was awarded the Distinguished Service Cross.

As a member of Robert M. La Follette's Progressive Party, he was clerk of Monroe County from 1921 to 1939 and, after joining the Republican Party, a member of the Assembly from 1939 to 1950.

Alex Nicol died in his hometown of Sparta at the age of 72.

References

People from Sparta, Wisconsin
Republican Party members of the Wisconsin State Assembly
Wisconsin Progressives (1924)
Military personnel from Wisconsin
United States Army officers
United States Army personnel of World War I
Recipients of the Distinguished Service Cross (United States)
1895 births
1967 deaths
20th-century American politicians